God Save the Queen/Under Heavy Manners is the second solo album by Robert Fripp, released on the Polydor Records label in 1980 (US catalogue no. PD-1-6266).

The album largely consists of Frippertronics, with much of the work being performed by improvisation. On the Under Heavy Manners side of the album, the effect was modified in what Fripp described as "Discotronics", adding a solid drum beat and bass line to create a dancier sound. The design concept was by Fripp and Chris Stein, with Stein credited for the cover photography.

The original planned title for the album was Music for Sports, but Fripp eventually decided to choose a title that would not be associated with colleague Brian Eno's Music for... album series.

The original album was released on CD for the first time in 2021, remastered by David Singleton, and including a previously unreleased jam titled "Music on Hold". The track "Under Heavy Manners" and a longer and retitled version of "The Zero of the Signified" (called "God Save the King") with an added guitar solo are on the abridged Robert Fripp and The League of Gentlemen God Save the King CD release.

Track listing
All compositions by Robert Fripp

Side A: God Save the Queen
"Red Two Scorer" - 6:54
"God Save the Queen" - 9:50
"1983" - 13:20

Side One: Under Heavy Manners
"Under Heavy Manners" - 5:14
"The Zero of the Signified" - 12:38

Fripp conceptually considered the Frippertronics of God Save the Queen and the Discotronics-based Under Heavy Manners as two independent pieces contained within one album, leading to the duality of the album's title, and the album's sides being designated as "Side A" and "Side One."

The guitar loops for the five tracks were recorded live in concert during 1979 (some of the ones on "1983" were performed on The Midnight Special,) with drum and bass parts added later that year by Michael Busta "Cherry" Jones (bass) and Paul Duskin (drums). All of the tracks are instrumental, bar "Under Heavy Manners", which features words half recited, half sung by David Byrne (credited using the pseudonym "Absalm el Habib").

The track "God Save the Queen" bears little resemblance to the British national anthem, although it is based on the opening notes of that tune. It was inspired by a comment from an audience member, who suggested that, as the performance was taking place on the tenth anniversary of the Woodstock Festival in August 1979, Fripp should reprise Jimi Hendrix's performance of "The Star-Spangled Banner".

Musicians
Robert Fripp : guitars, Frippertronics
Busta Jones : bass on Under Heavy Manners and The Zero of the Signified
Paul Duskins : drums on Under Heavy Manners and The Zero of the Signified
Absalm el Habib (a.k.a. David Byrne) : singer on Under Heavy Manners

References

1980 albums
Robert Fripp albums
Albums produced by Robert Fripp
Polydor Records albums
E.G. Records albums